Flight 825 may refer to

Nigeria Airways Flight 825, crashed on 20 November 1969
China Airlines Flight 825, exploded on 20 November 1971
Air Rhodesia Flight 825, shot down on 3 September 1978

0825